Muthampalayam is a neighbourhood locality in Erode city, Tamil Nadu. It was a village panchayat till 2011. Later during the expansion of Erode Municipal Corporation, this officially became a part of it.

Demographics
 India census, Muthampalayam village had a population of 1,033. Males constitute a population 890 and females 919. Muthampalayam has an average literacy rate of 70.02%, lower than the state average of 80.09%: male literacy is 79.88%, and female literacy is 60.50%. Among the total population of Muthampalayam, 8.90% of the population is under 6 years of age.

References

Neighbourhoods in Erode